Aleta Chuko is one of the Woredas in the Sidama Region of Ethiopia.  It has twenty seven kebeles including Qorke, Rufo, Loko, Gure, Dongora, Siqee, Teso, and Chuko Town (chuko01 & chuko02) has two kebeles totalling twenty nine. Aleta chuko has economical source in richoff coffee, inseti (kochoo), peanaple, chat those are main source of economic contributor of the worda.the woreda has irregational dam on the river of Gidawo river which has supporting agricultural cultivation for main fruit like mango, peanaple, orange, avocado etc. contributing to the area, country and exporting in the future.

Location
Aleta Chuko is located within  6460'- 6720' N and 3820'-3856'E Longitude and Latitude respectively.

Aleta Chuko is bordered on the south by Dara, on the southwest by the Oromia Region, on the west by Loka Abaya, on the north by Dale, and on the east by Aleta Wendo. The administrative center is Chuko. Chuko was separated from Aleta Wendo woreda.

Population 
Based on the 2007 Census conducted by the CSA, this woreda has a total population of 167,300, of whom 85,928 are men and 81,372 women; 5,673 or 3.39% of its population are urban dwellers. The majority of the inhabitants were Protestants, with 90.95% of the population reporting that belief, 2.4% practiced Ethiopian Orthodox Christianity, 2.27% were Catholic, 2.09% observed traditional religions, and 1.05% were Muslim.

Notes 

Sidama Region